Guru Gaddi (Punjabi: ਗੁਰੂ ਗੱਦੀ), alternatively spelt as Gurgadi, Gurgadhi, or Gurgaddi, means "seat of the guru". The Gurgadi being passed from one Sikh guru to the next was a ceremony that bestowed the guruship upon the new guru. Guru-ta-Gaddi is an important Sikh religious event held every 3 November. The event honors when the tenth and last Sikh Gurus when they said 'the next Guru would be the Holy Sikh Book' Guru Granth Sahib.  Guru Gobind Singh, declared that Guru Granth Sahib would from that moment on be the Guru or the Guiding Force. The message was delivered on 3 November 1708 by Guru Gobind Singh at Nanded in the state of Maharashtra in India. Guru Gobind Singh Ji established Khalsa and conferred the status of the Guru to the Guru Granth Sahib and elevated it as the everlasting Guru.

This event is commemorated with a festival/ritual that starts with Diwali in India. The tercentenary celebrations of the occasion are being referred at Guru-da-gaddi and are being celebrated on 3 November 2008 in Nanded in Maharashtra. The occasion comes after celebrations of 300 Years of Khalsa panth established by Guru Gobind Singh in 1699.

Gallery

See also 

 Baba Buddha
 Gurpurb
 Joti Jot
 Guru Maneyo Granth

References

External links
 https://web.archive.org/web/20080719151813/http://www.sikhdharma.org/content-ten-sikh-gurus-siri-guru-granth-sahib

History of Sikhism
Sikh festivals
Nanded
Religious festivals in India